George Jackson (31 December 1856 – 12 February 1938) was a member of the Queensland Legislative Assembly.

Biography
Jackson was born in Manchester, England, the son of James Jackson and his wife Hannah (née Hilton). He married Mary Hannah Welch at Charters Towers in 1878.

He died in New Farm in February 1938 and was buried in the South Brisbane Cemetery.

Public career
Jackson held the seat of Kennedy in the Queensland Legislative Assembly from 1893 until his defeat in 1909. He was the Chairman of Committees 1903-1907 and the Secretary for Mines and Public Works in 1909.

References

Members of the Queensland Legislative Assembly
1856 births
1938 deaths
Burials in South Brisbane Cemetery
Australian Labor Party members of the Parliament of Queensland